Tōhō Maru was an oiler of the Imperial Japanese Navy (IJN). The ship was launched as a civilian oil tanker for Iino Kaiun Kaisha on May 1, 1936. On August 20, 1941 the ship was requisitioned by the IJN and converted into a fleet replenishment oiler. The ship subsequently served Japan during the Pacific Campaign of World War II.

References

See also
Foreign commerce and shipping of Empire of Japan

1936 ships
Auxiliary ships of the Imperial Japanese Navy
Ships sunk by American submarines
World War II shipwrecks in the Pacific Ocean
Oilers
Ships built by Kawasaki Heavy Industries